Adolf Pokorny  (born 25 July 1895 in Vienna, Austria, d. unknown) was a dermatologist. who primarily is known as having been a defendant in the Doctors' Trial at Nuremberg.

Early Years

His father was a lieutenant colonel in the Austro-Hungarian army, and was frequently transferred to different countries in Eastern Europe; the family moved with him.

First World War

Pokorny was drafted into the Austro-Hungarian army and served from March 1915 to September 1918 in the First World War.  He completed his medical doctorate on 22 March 1922 and received his medical license. After two years of clinical training, he opened a practice in Komotau. His application to join the Nazi party was declined in 1939, because he had been married to a Jewish physician, Dr. Lilly Weil, with whom he had two children and from whom he had been divorced in April 1935. While the children survived the war in the UK, Lilly Pokorná as an internee in Ghetto Terezin led the first radiology station in the camp. After the war, she emigrated with the children to Brazil.

World War II and Doctors' Trial

During World War II, Pokorny worked as a medical officer of the German Armed Forces. Pokorny wrote to Heinrich Himmler to suggest sterilization of Russian prisoners of war utilizing the sap of the caladium plant, which, according to an article in a medical journal, was thought to cause sterilization in mice.  The  method was not implemented due to technical obstacles. Pokorny was tried by the American Military Tribunal No. I (also known as the Doctors' Trial) in August 1947.   Despite the letter, he was found to have had no direct involvement in compulsory sterilization experiments, and was acquitted.

References

1895 births
Austrian dermatologists
Year of death missing
Physicians in the Nazi Party
Austrian people of World War I
German military personnel of World War II
People indicted for war crimes
People acquitted by the United States Nuremberg Military Tribunals
20th-century deaths